The Grand Order of Queen Jelena, or more fully the Grand Order of Queen Jelena with Sash and Morning Star (Velered kraljice Jelene s lentom i Danicom), is an order of the Republic of Croatia.  It was established in 1995.  It ranks second in the Croatian order of precedence after the Grand Order of King Tomislav.

The order, along with the Grand Order of King Petar Krešimir IV, is awarded to dignitaries, other state officials and heads of international organizations for their contributions to the international reputation and status of the Republic of Croatia; to Croatian and foreign statesmen and parliamentary and government leaders for exceptional contributions to the independence and integrity of the Republic of Croatia, the development and construction of the Republic of Croatia, and for their personal exceptional contributions to the development of relationships between Croatia and the Croatian people and other countries and peoples; and to senior armed forces officers for exceptional contributions in the formulation of military strategy and doctrine, for merit in developing the Croatian armed forces, and for particular accomplishment in the leadership and command of the Croatian armed forces.

It is named after Queen Helen I of Croatia.

Description
The badge of the order is a blue trefoil edged in gold.  The trefoil is topped by a crown in the form of the upper part of the Croatian coat of arms (five shields representing the five geographical regions that comprise Croatia) with the words "KRALJICE JELENE" at the base.  The badge is suspended from a sash of equal stripes of blue, white and red, with an interwoven wattle pattern on the red and blue stripes.

The star of the order has the badge above on a star with eight longer and eight shorter silver rays, with gold rays between.

Notable recipients

Foreign officials
 2017 -   Mozah bint Nasser Al Missned  (as Her Highness Sheikha Mozah bint Nasser)
 2013 -   Queen Silvia of Sweden (as Queen of Sweden)
 2011 -   Queen Sonja of Norway (as Queen of Norway)
 2008 -  Yasuo Fukuda  (as Prime Minister of Japan)
 2007 -  Mikuláš Dzurinda (as former Prime Minister of Slovakia)
 2007 -  Wolfgang Schüssel (as former Chancellor of Austria)
 2006 -  Gerhard Schröder 
 2006 -  Helmut Kohl
 2006 -  Josep Borrell Fontelles
 2006 -  Wilfried Martens
 2006 -  Hans-Gert Pöttering
 2003 -  Prince Henrik of Denmark 
 2002 -  József Antall
 2000 -  Madeleine Albright
 1995 -  Mother Teresa of Calcutta
 1995 -  Alija Izetbegović  (as President of the Presidency of Bosnia and Herzegovina)
 1995 -  Krešimir Zubak (as President of the Federation of Bosnia and Herzegovina)Croatian dignitaries
 2021 - Jadranka Kosor (as former Prime Minister of Croatia) 2008 - Luka Bebić (as President of Sabor) 2008 - Ivo Sanader (as Prime Minister of Croatia) - revoked 2008 - Josip Manolić (as former Prime Minister of Croatia) 2008 - Ivica Račan (as former Prime Minister of Croatia) - awarded posthumously 1998 - Franjo Kuharić (as former Archbishop of Zagreb) Further reading 
 Zakon o odlikovanjima i priznanjima Republike Hrvatske,  NN 20/95 ("Law on Decorations", in Croatian)
 Hrvatska Odlikovanja'', Narodne Novine, Zagreb 1996.

References 

Orders, decorations, and medals of Croatia
Awards established in 1995
Queen Jelena, Grand Order of
1995 establishments in Croatia